Toast is a studio album by American post-hardcore band Tar, released in 1993 through Touch and Go Records.

Track listing

Personnel

Performers
John Mohr - Guitar, vocals
Mark Zablocki - Guitar
Tom Zaluckyj - Bass
Mike Greenlees - Drums

Production
Bob Hanson - Photography
David Lounsbury - Recording for "The French Horn"

References

External links

1993 albums